Chuba Amechi Akpom (born 9 October 1995) is a professional footballer who plays as a striker for EFL Championship club Middlesbrough.

Akpom began his career at Arsenal, making his senior debut in 2013. Whilst at Arsenal, he had loan periods with English clubs Brentford, Coventry City, Nottingham Forest, Hull City, Brighton and Belgian club Sint-Truiden. In 2018, he signed for Greek club PAOK for an undisclosed fee. After a successful spell at PAOK, he moved to Middlesbrough in 2020. In 2021, he returned to PAOK on loan. He is considered a club icon at PAOK, being a vital part in the double-winning squad of 2018-19, scoring crucial goals, including the only goal in the 2019 Greek Cup Final.

Born in London to Nigerian parents, Akpom is a dual citizen of the United Kingdom and Nigeria. He has represented England at youth and under-21 international levels and in 2019, he announced he switched his international allegiance to represent Nigeria for future games.

Club career

Arsenal 

Akpom joined Arsenal at the age of six. He made his debut for the Arsenal U18 side at the age of 15, and signed his first professional contract with Arsenal on 10 October 2012, a day after turning 17. In December 2012, Akpom received his first call into the Arsenal senior squad, when he was an unused substitute for a 2–1 Champions League defeat to Olympiakos. He made 20 U21 Premier League appearances during the 2012–13 season and scored 13 goals, including 10 goals in 10 games in the Elite Group stage. In the lead-up to the 2013–14 season, Akpom was selected for Arsenal's pre-season tour of Asia and scored once in a 7–0 win against an Indonesia Dream Team, two more in a 7–1 win against Vietnam and another in Arsenal's final game of the tour against Urawa Red Diamonds. Akpom made his competitive debut in a 3–1 Premier League win over Sunderland on 14 September 2013. He came on in the third minute of injury time as a substitute for the injured Olivier Giroud. Akpom's second Arsenal appearance came in a League Cup third round tie away to West Bromwich Albion on 25 September. He replaced goalscorer Thomas Eisfeld after 82 minutes and with the scores at 1–1 at full-time, the game entered extra time. Akpom played the full scoreless extra time period and scored Arsenal's third penalty in the ensuing shootout, helping Arsenal to a win. He scored three goals in four UEFA Youth League appearances towards the end of 2013. Akpom scored a hattrick in a 6–1 FA Youth Cup fourth round demolition of Peterborough United on 6 January 2014.

Brentford (loan) 
On 30 December 2013, it was reported that League One sides Brentford, Peterborough United, Leyton Orient and Milton Keynes Dons were in a four-way battle to sign Akpom on loan. Brentford emerged as the favourites to land Akpom, due to the club's head of recruitment, Shaun O'Connor, having originally signed Akpom while working for Arsenal. The loan was thrown into doubt due to injuries suffered by Arsenal strikers Theo Walcott and Nicklas Bendtner in early January 2014, but was completed on 9 January, with Akpom signing for a month. Manager Mark Warburton said "Chuba is strong and quick, with a very good first touch. He's greedy and enjoys scoring goals. It's his first loan spell and League One is tough, so he might take some time to adapt. It's a big jump from Under 21 football".

He missed the first match of his loan through illness and Warburton stressed that Akpom would have to "work hard and earn his place like everyone else". Akpom made his debut in a 1–1 league draw at Walsall on 19 January. He came on for Will Grigg after 68 minutes and provided a cross for Clayton Donaldson in the dying moments, which went unconverted. After making four substitute appearances, his loan spell ended and he returned to Arsenal. Following the return to Arsenal, Akpom appeared on Arsenal Magazine about his time at Brentford for the March issue.

Coventry City (loan) 
On 14 February 2014, Akpom joined League One side Coventry City on loan until the end of the 2013–14 season, with an agreement that he would rejoin the Arsenal squad for games in the FA Youth Cup and UEFA Youth League during the course of the loan. He made six appearances.

Return to Arsenal 
Akpom began the 2014–15 season by scoring a hat trick for Arsenal in an Under-21 Premier League Division 2 game against West Bromwich Albion at the end of August. On 23 September 2014, he made his first senior appearance of the season, replacing Héctor Bellerín for the last four minutes as Arsenal lost 1–2 at home against Southampton in the League Cup. He made his first Premier League appearance of the season against Southampton on New Year's Day 2015. Akpom made a telling contribution to Arsenal's 5–0 home win against Aston Villa, coming on as a second-half substitute and winning a penalty, converted by Santi Cazorla, his first assist for the club. On 4 February 2015, Akpom spurned the interest of a number of other clubs from the Premier League and across Europe to sign a new -year contract with Arsenal.

Nottingham Forest (loan) 
On 26 March 2015, he joined Championship club Nottingham Forest on loan till 31 May 2015. He made seven appearances.

Hull City (loan) 

On 4 August 2015, Akpom joined Championship side Hull City on a season-long loan. Akpom made his debut for the Yorkshire based club on the opening weekend of the 2015–16 season scoring the second goal in a 2–0 home win to Huddersfield Town on 8 August.
Akpom made his second appearance from the bench replacing Nikica Jelavic in the 60th minute in the League Cup first round against Accrington Stanley. He scored in the 92nd minute in the first half of extra time and netted a penalty in a 4–3 shootout win for the Tigers. On 30 January 2016 Akpom scored his first senior hat-trick in the FA Cup match away to Bury that Hull won 3–1. He was an unused substitute in the 2016 Championship play-off final at Wembley as Hull beat Sheffield Wednesday to gain promotion to the Premier League.

Brighton (loan)

On 30 January 2017, Akpom joined Brighton & Hove Albion on loan until the end of the season. He made 10 appearances where he helped The Albion gain promotion to the Premier League.

Sint-Truiden (loan)
On 31 January 2018, Akpom joined Belgian First Division A side Sint-Truiden on loan until the end of the season. Akpom scored his first goal for the club in a 1–0 victory against Anderlecht on 17 February 2018.

PAOK 
On 2 August 2018, Akpom joined Greek Super League club PAOK Salonika on a three-year deal. On 25 August, he made his debut with the club as a substitute in a 1–0 home win game against Asteras Tripoli. On 11 November, he scored his first goal in a 2–1 home league win game against Panetolikos.
 In March 2019 the BBC said that Akpom was a key player in PAOK's title push. He was an unused substitute on 21 April 2019 when PAOK beat already relegated Levadiakos to confirm their first Super League title in 34 years.

He scored the only goal in PAOK's 2019 Greek Cup Final win against AEK Athens.

On 6 August 2019, he scored against Ajax in the first leg of their UEFA Champions League third qualifying round tie that ended as a 2–2 draw. He scored his first goal of the 2019–20 Superleague Greece in a 2–1 home win against Panionios on 1 September. On 1 March 2020, receiving a great pass from Omar El Kaddouri inside the penalty area, Akpom cut to a shooting position, subsequently whipping an excellent effort beyond the opposing goalkeeper, to open the score in a frustrating 1–1 away draw against Xanthi F.C. It was his 7th goal for Super League in the most productive year in his career so far.

Middlesbrough
On 19 September 2020, Akpom signed for English club Middlesbrough for a fee of £2.75m. The former Arsenal youngster joined from PAOK, where he had made a huge impression in the Greek Super League. Akpom signed a three-year contract, with the option of a further year. He scored on his Middlesbrough debut, a 1–1 draw with QPR on 26 September. 

On 26 August 2021, PAOK announced the return of Akpom on loan from Middlesbrough until the end of the 2021–22 season.

Chuba continued his fine run of form on Boxing Day 2022 when he netted his first hat-trick for Boro in a 4–1 win over Wigan Athletic at the Riverside Stadium which left him the top goal scorer in the Championship. On 5 January 2023, Middlesbrough manager Michael Carrick announced that the club had exercised a twelve-month contract extension on Akpom having scored thirteen goals in twenty matches.

On 4 March 2023, Akpom scored 2 goals in a 5–0 home win against Reading, in the process becoming the first Middlesbrough player to score 20 league goals in a season since Bernie Slaven in 1990.

International career 
On 15 February 2011, Akpom made his debut for England U16s in a friendly match against Slovenia, which ended in a 0–0 draw. He second and final game for the U16s came in a 3–0 2010/11 Victory Shield win over Northern Ireland on 23 March 2011. On 2 August 2011, Akpom made his U17 debut, scoring once in 4–0 win over the Faroe Islands. He played in all six games and scored two goals during England's unsuccessful 2012 European U17 Championship qualifying campaign. He made 13 appearances in total for the U17s, and scored five goals. On 6 September 2012, Akpom made his England U19 debut in a 3–1 defeat to Germany. He scored his first goal for the U19s on 26 September 2012, in a 3–0 2013 European U19 Championship qualifying win over Estonia. Two days later, he scored two goals in a 6–0 win over the Faroe Islands. He played in five of England's six 2013 European U19 Championship qualifying and elite stage games and scored three goals, as England failed to qualify for the finals.

On 11 October 2014, Akpom scored his first goals for England U20 coming on as an 87th-minute substitute to score a brace against Netherlands U20 in a 3–2 victory. On 13 October 2015, Akpom made his England U21 debut playing 90 minutes and scoring with the last kick of the match in a European qualifying win over Kazakhstan. He scored again for the England U21 team in a UEFA Euro Under-21 Qualifier against Switzerland. England U21 won the match 3–1, with Akpom scoring in the injury time of the second half.

Akpom, who is of Nigerian descent, is still eligible to represent Nigeria. In May 2016, it was reported that he was one of three players formally approached by the Nigeria Football Federation.

Akpom has recently been selected for the England under-21s for the UEFA European Championship qualifier against Norway on Tuesday 6 September 2016.

On 28 March 2017, Akpom was reportedly close to switching to Nigeria alongside Ola Aina of Chelsea after discussions with Nigeria Football Federation president, Amaju Pinnick.

In September 2019, he confirmed that he intended to represent Nigeria at international level. In an interview with BBC Sport, he stated: "It was a personal decision. I'm Nigerian and my whole family feel very Nigerian and it will be nice to represent Nigeria"

Career statistics

Honours
Arsenal
 FA Cup: 2013–14, 2014–15

Hull City
 Football League Championship play-offs: 2016

Brighton & Hove Albion
 EFL Championship runner-up: 2016–17

PAOK
 Super League Greece: 2018–19
 Greek Cup: 2018–19; runner-up: 2021–22

Individual
 Greek Cup Final Most Valuable Player: 2018–19
EFL Championship Player of the Month: December 2022

References

External links 

 Chuba Akpom profile at The Football Association website
 Chuba Akpom profile at Premier League website
 

1995 births
Living people
Footballers from Canning Town
English footballers
Association football forwards
Arsenal F.C. players
Brentford F.C. players
Coventry City F.C. players
Hull City A.F.C. players
Nottingham Forest F.C. players
Brighton & Hove Albion F.C. players
Sint-Truidense V.V. players
PAOK FC players
Middlesbrough F.C. players
Premier League players
English Football League players
Belgian Pro League players
Super League Greece players
England youth international footballers
England under-21 international footballers
English expatriate footballers
Expatriate footballers in Belgium
Expatriate footballers in Greece
English expatriate sportspeople in Belgium
English expatriate sportspeople in Greece
Black British sportsmen
English people of Nigerian descent
People educated at St Bonaventure's Catholic School